Learning Hebrew, also known as Gothsploitation, is a British arthouse film written and directed by Louis Joon, his first film as a director. It was released in 2012 by The Weird World of Wibbell, the home video distribution division of Wibbell Productions Ltd, an independent film company based in the UK, run by actor Allin Kempthorne and best known for its previous film The Vampires of Bloody Island.

Cast
Learning Hebrew: A Gothsploitation Movie was cast with real life characters, performers and models from London’s alternative scene.
The cast includes Zoe Dorman,  Dave Disaster,  Frederick William Park,  Mike Barrington,   Louis Joon,  Annie Ososova,  Bonnie Baker,  Eve Young,  Glenn Walbridge,  Julia Reed,  Neko Loveless,  Victoria Gugenheim,  David Wilkinson,  Julian Smith,  Allin Kempthorne, Emma Joon Dyer,  Takara Bell,  Alysia Reynolds,  Alex Clarke and  Tim Williams.

Plot
The plot notes on the UK version DVD sleeve read:

"When criticism of faith and the freedom to offend is outlawed by the Politically Correct Militia, Bella and her gang of idealistic cyberpunks push Darwinism door-to-door. But with agnostic thugs in the street and the Atheist Revolutionary Army attacking the liberal establishment, Bella and her friends are driven underground into a dark fetish existence, where the future and past collide, allegiances are strained and old scores must be settled."

Music
Bands with their music on the soundtrack include Six Toes, Senser, Mortad, Bryan Steeksma, Verena von Horsten
and Maleficent Martini.

Festivals
The film was shown at the Portobello Film Festival in September 2012 and at the Horror-on-Sea Film Festival in January 2014.

Reception
Reviewers gave mixed reactions to Learning Hebrew, with Support Independent Cinema saying "LEARNING HEBREW is one of the most unique viewing  you're likely to ever see.", Aron Ra calling it "the weird kind of strange" and Christian Watch calling it "a tidal wave of filth and sin".

References

External links
 
 Watch Learning Hebrew (A Gothsploitation Movie) | Prime Video

2012 films
British drama films
2010s English-language films
2010s British films